Charles Sampson may refer to:
 Charles Sampson (bull rider) (born 1957), American bull rider
 Charles Sampson (footballer) (born 1980), Ghanaian international footballer